Inside Björk is an official DVD released by Björk on 23 August 2003. The DVD contains a documentary outlining the career of Björk, from her early work in Icelandic bands, to joining The Sugarcubes to her solo work up to 2002. The documentary gives viewers a personal view into her private thoughts, views and motivations. Inside Björk also features interviews with Sean Penn, Lars von Trier, Thom Yorke, Beck, RZA, Elton John, Missy Elliott, the late Alexander McQueen and more on their thoughts of Björk and her impact on music and culture. The documentary coincided with the release of the Greatest Hits album, and had previously been seen on some television networks at the end of 2002. It was commissioned by One Little Indian to make up for the fact that Björk was beginning to do fewer interviews than had been previous. Two small new live performances are included in the documentary, "Generous Palmstroke" performed with Zeena Parkins and an organ version of "The Anchor Song" played in an Icelandic church.

Track list

References

Björk video albums
2003 video albums
2003 documentary films
Documentary films about women in music